Akash Anil Chikte (born 24 July 1992) is an Indian field hockey player who plays as a goalkeeper. He was part of the Indian squad that won the gold medal at the 2016 Asian Men's Hockey Champions Trophy.

References

External links
Player profile at Hockey India

1992 births
Living people
People from Yavatmal
Indian male field hockey players
Male field hockey goalkeepers
Field hockey players from Maharashtra